is a passenger railway station located in the city of Hasuda, Saitama, Japan, operated by East Japan Railway Company (JR East).

Lines

Station layout
This station consists of an elevated station building with one ground-level side platform and one ground-level island platform serving a total of three tracks. The station has a Midori no Madoguchi staffed ticket office.

Platforms

History

Hasuda Station opened on 16 July 1885. With the privatization of JNR on 1 April 1987, the station came under the control of JR East.

Passenger statistics
In fiscal 2019, the station was used by an average of 20,804 passengers daily (boarding passengers only).

The passenger figures for previous years are as shown below.

Surrounding area

A monument was erected on the west side station forecourt, consisting of the driving wheels of former JNR Class D51 steam locomotive D51 484 and the wheels of a former 115 series electric multiple unit train.

 
 University of Human Arts and Sciences
 Nihon Pharmaceutical University

References

External links

 Hasuda Station information (JR East) 
 Hasuda Station information (Saitama Prefectural Government) 

Railway stations in Saitama Prefecture
Railway stations in Japan opened in 1885
Tōhoku Main Line
Utsunomiya Line
Hasuda, Saitama